The Mureș (German: Mieresch) is a  river in Eastern Europe. It originates in the Hășmașu Mare Range in the Eastern Carpathian Mountains, Romania, rising close to the headwaters of the river Olt, and joins the Tisza at Szeged in southeastern Hungary.

The Mureș River flows through the Romanian counties Harghita, Mureș, Alba, Hunedoara, Arad and Timiș, and the Hungarian county Csongrád. The largest cities on the Mureș/Maros are Târgu Mureș, Alba Iulia, Deva and Arad in Romania, and Makó in Hungary.

Some  on the northern side of the river are protected as part of the Körös-Maros National Park.

Salt used to be traded in medieval times on the river on large rafts.

Name
The river is known to be first mentioned by Herodotus in 484 BC bearing the name Maris (Μάρις). Strabo calls it Marisos (Μάρισος).

Towns and villages
The following towns are situated along the river Mureș, from source to mouth: Toplița, Reghin, Târgu Mureș, Luduș, Ocna Mureș, Aiud, Teiuș, Alba Iulia, Geoagiu, Orăștie, Simeria, Deva, Lipova, Arad, Nădlac (all in Romania), Makó, Szeged (both in Hungary).

The Mureș flows through the following communes (grouped by counties, from source to mouth): 
Harghita County: Voșlăbeni, Suseni, Joseni, Remetea, Subcetate, Sărmaș, Gălăuțaș, Toplița
Mureș County: Stânceni, Lunca Bradului, Răstolița, Deda, Rușii-Munți, Aluniș, Brâncovenești, Ideciu de Jos, Suseni, Reghin, Petelea, Gornești, Glodeni, Ernei, Sântana de Mureș, Sângeorgiu de Mureș, Târgu Mureș, Sâncraiu de Mureș, Cristești, Pănet, Ungheni, Sânpaul, Iernut, Cuci, Bogata, Luduș, Chețani
Alba County: Noșlac, Lunca Mureșului, Ocna Mureș, Unirea, Mirăslău, Aiud, Rădești, Teiuș, Sântimbru, Ciugud, Alba Iulia, Vințu de Jos, Blandiana, Săliștea, Șibot
Hunedoara County: Geoagiu, Orăștie, Turdaș, Rapoltu Mare, Simeria, Hărău, Deva, Șoimuș, Vețel, Brănișca, Ilia, Gurasada, Dobra, Burjuc, Zam
Arad County: Petriș, Săvârșin, Birchiș, Vărădia de Mureș, Bata, Bârzava, Conop, Ususău, Lipova, Păuliș, Frumușeni, Fântânele, Vladimirescu, Arad, Zădăreni, Felnac, Pecica, Secusigiu, Semlac, Șeitin, Nădlac
Timiș County: Periam, Sânpetru Mare, Sânnicolau Mare, Cenad
Csongrád County: Nagylak, Magyarcsanád, Apátfalva, Makó, Kiszombor, Ferencszállás, Maroslele, Klárafalva, Deszk, Szeged

Tributaries
The following rivers are tributaries to the river Mureș (from source to mouth):

Left: Cărbunele Negru, Senetea, Fierăstrăul, Șumuleul Mare, Borzontul Mare, Borzontul Mic, Pietrosul, Bacta, Limbuș, Piatra, Eseniu, Martonca, Calnaci, Muscă, Gălăuțaș, Zăpodea, Măgheruș, Mărșinețul de Sus, Gudea Mare, Sălard, Iod, Borzia, Sebeș, Fițcău, Idicel, Deleni, Gurghiu, Mocear, Beica, Habic, Petrilaca, Valea cu Nuci, Terebici, Pocloș, Budiu, Niraj, Pârâul Mare, Lăscud, Sărata, Șeulia, Valea Luncilor, Ațintiș, Găbud, Fărău, Ciunga, Pusta Băgăului, Rât, Târnava, Hăpria, Sebeș, Pianul, Cioara, Cugir, Vaidei, Romos, Orăștie, Turdaș, Strei, Tâmpa, Cerna, Herepeia, Căoi, Vulcez, Leșnic, Săcămaș, Plai, Dobra, Abucea, Valea Mare, Sălciva, Peștiș, Căpriorișca, Somonița, Birchiș, Izvor, Corbul, Fiac, Suliniș, Lalașinț, Chelmac, Pârâul Mare, Șiștarovăț, Țârnobara, Sinicoț, Valea Fânețelor de Jos, Zădărlac, Zădăreni

Right: Chindeni, Arinul Scurt, Chirtoegher, Strâmba, Pârâul Noroios, Belcina, Lăzarea, Ghiduț, Ditrău, Faier, Jolotca, Filipea, Sărmaș, Ciucic, Toplița, Călimănel, Mermezeu, Zebrac, Neagra, Ilva, Obcina Ferigerilor, Răstolița, Gălăoaia, Bistra, Pietriș, Dumbrava, Râpa, Agriș, Lueriu, Luț, Șar, Voiniceni, Cuieșd, Valea Fânațelor, Șăușa, Valea din Jos, Lechința, Ranta, Pârâul de Câmpie, Grindeni, Arieș, Unirea, Ciugud, Ormeniș, Mirăslău, Lopadea, Aiud, Gârbova, Geoagiu (Alba), Galda, Ampoi, Pâclișa, Valea Vințului, Blandiana, Stânișoara, Băcăinți, Homorod, Geoagiu (Hunedoara), Boiul, Bobâlna, Valea lui Sânpetru, Lazu, Vărmaga, Certej, Boholt, Căian, Bejan, Boz, Sârbi, Băcișoara, Gurasada, Zam, Almaș, Petriș, Crăciuneasca, Troaș, Vinești, Stejar, Julița, Valea Mare, Grosul, Monoroștia, Bârzava, Nadăș, Conop, Cornic, Milova, Jernova, Șoimoș, Radna, Cladova, Crac, Száraz-ér

Images

See also 

 List of rivers of Romania
 Tributaries of Mureș River (Romanian and Hungarian names)
 List of rivers of Europe

References 

 
Rivers of Hungary
Rivers of Romania
Rivers of Harghita County
Rivers of Mureș County
Rivers of Alba County
Rivers of Hunedoara County
Rivers of Arad County
International rivers of Europe
Braided rivers in Europe